UHI Inverness is one of the thirteen partners that make up the  University of the Highlands and Islands, based in Inverness in the Highland council area of Scotland. A new main building at Inverness Campus was opened in August 2015, with most students and staff now located there. UHI Inverness has a second campus at The Scottish School of Forestry, based near Balloch. UHI Inverness is a tertiary organisation providing education to school pupils, and at further education, higher education and postgraduate levels, together with training for apprentices and a wide range of short courses for business. Student accommodation is also available on the new campus.

It has more than 1,700 students studying towards degree courses. It is among the first Colleges in Scotland to deliver both Foundation and Graduate level Apprenticeships.

New campus 

In May 2010 it was decided that the college would move to a new purpose-built site at the Beechwood farm, co-locating with the Scottish Agricultural College, the Centre for Health Science phase 4, and a training hotel operated by a partnership between the Calman Trust and Albyn Housing.

This was completed in 2015 and includes facilities for private sector research & development, inward investors, student accommodation, sports facilities, a community and cultural centre within landscaped parkland. This forms a vision for the development over the next thirty years.

The  campus at Beechwood, just off the A9 south of Inverness, is considered to be one of the most important developments for the region over the next 20 years. The principal of UHI at the time, James Fraser, said: "This is a flagship development which will provide Inverness with a university campus and vibrant student life. It will have a major impact on the city and on the Highlands and Islands. UHI is a partnership of colleges and research centres throughout the region, and the development of any one partner brings strength to the whole institution."

It was estimated that the new campus would contribute more than £50million to the economy of the Highlands because it could attract innovative commercial businesses interested in research and development, while increasing the number of students who study within the city by around 3,000.

Governance
In November 2012 Diane Rawlinson was appointed as Principal and Chief-executive, taking up the post in February 2013. In June 2017, the college's board of management appointed Christopher O'Neil to become principal in the following academic year.

References

External links
 

Education in Inverness
University of the Highlands and Islands
Higher education colleges in Scotland